The BMW N53 is a naturally aspirated straight-six petrol engine which was produced from 2006 to 2013. The N53 replaced the BMW N52 and was released in 2006 in the post-facelift E60 5 Series.

BMW never sold the N53 engine in North American, Australian and Malaysian vehicles, due to the high sulphur content of the fuel available in these markets. Instead, these regions continued to use its predecessor, the N52 engine.

The N53 is the final naturally aspirated straight-six engine produced by BMW, ending a history of continuous production of this engine configuration since the BMW M30 in 1968. The N53 began to be phased out following the introduction of the BMW N20 turbocharged four-cylinder engine in 2011.

There is no BMW M version of the N53. The BMW N54 turbocharged straight-6 engine was produced alongside the N53.



Design 

Compared with its N52 predecessor which was port-injected, the N53 uses direct injection. The direct injection system uses piezoelectric fuel injectors which inject into the combustion chamber, using a stratified lean mixture operation. The compression ratio was increased to 12.0:1 for the N53.

As per the N52, the N53 has double-VANOS (variable valve timing) and a magnesium alloy block. Unlike the N52, the N53 does not have Valvetronic (variable valve lift), due to space limitations in the cylinder head.

Each cylinder has coil-on-plug ignition, as per the N52.

Versions

N53B25 

Applications:
 2006-2010 E60/E61 523i

N53B30 (150 kW) 
A  version of the N53 was used in the pre-facelift F10 523i.

Applications:
 2009-2011 F10/F11 523i

N53B30 (160 kW) 
This  version of the N53 produces , the same figure as the  version of its N52 predecessor.

Applications:
 2007-2013 E90/E91/E92/E93 325i
 2006-2010 E60/E61 525i

N53B30 (190 kW) 
A  version of the N53 was used in the pre-facelift F10 528i.

Applications:
 2009-2011 F10/F11 528i

N53B30 (200 kW) 

Applications:
 2007-2010 E60/E61 530i
 2007-2010 E63 630i
 2007-2013 E90/E91/E92/E93 330i 
 2011-2013 F10 530i

High-Pressure Fuel Pump failures 
The N53 uses the same High-Pressure Fuel Pump (HPFP) as the BMW N54 turbocharged straight-six engine, which had HPFP failures leading to Lemon Law "buy backs" and legal action in the United States. The N53 engine was not sold in the United States, therefore the N53 engine was not involved with these actions.

Failures of the N53 HPFP have been reported, although it is not known whether failure in the N53 is as common as the N54.

See also
 BMW
 List of BMW engines

References

N53
Straight-six engines
Gasoline engines by model